Lahore Town Hall, formerly known as Victoria Jubilee Town Hall is the seat for the civic government of the city of Lahore, Pakistan.

History
It was built to honor the Golden Jubilee of Queen Victoria, and was originally called Victoria Jubilee Town Hall; the capstone was emplaced by Charles Umpherston Aitchison. Prince Albert Victor, Duke of Clarence and Avondale attended the 3 February 1890 opening celebration. The two story building was designed based of a winning entrant plan by a Chennai architect named Pogson. The structure has Mughal, Sultanate, and Spanish design elements, and sees a lancent arch flanked by corner towers ending in merlons. The total construction cost was Rs. 60,000.

See also
Architecture of Lahore

References

Buildings and structures in Lahore
1890 establishments in British India